Turners Marsh is a rural locality in the local government area (LGA) of Launceston in the Launceston LGA region of Tasmania. The 2016 census recorded a population of 254 for the state suburb of Turners Marsh.

History 
Turners Marsh was gazetted as a locality in 1963. The original European name for this area was “Mountgarrets Lagoon”.

Geography
The boundaries consist primarily of survey lines. The Bell Bay Railway Line follows the south-western boundary.

Road infrastructure 
Route B83 (Pipers River Road) passes through from south to north.

References

Towns in Tasmania
Localities of City of Launceston